Néstor Guillén assumed office as the interim 40th President of Bolivia on 21 July 1946, and his mandate ended on 17 August 1946. A magistrate of the Superior District Court of La Paz, Guillén was chosen to lead an interim junta in the absence of the President of the District Court Tomás Monje, who was ill at the time, in the wake of the violent demise of President Gualberto Villarroel.

Guillén formed one cabinet three days after taking office,  constituting the 112th national cabinet of Bolivia as part of the 1946–1947 Government Junta.

Cabinet Ministers

Composition 
On 24 July 1946, the civil junta which made up Néstor Guillén's cabinet was expanded to include representatives from the labor, student, and magistrate sectors. Minister of Finance Luis Gosalvez Indaburu, a partner in the law firm employed by Moritz Hochschild, would represent the universities while Foreign Minister Aniceto Solares would represent the teachers. Aurelio Alcoba, the Secretary-General of the Trade Union Confederation of Bolivian Workers, was appointed Minister of Work and Social Security as the representative of the worker's unions. Roberto Bilbao la Vieja, employed by the Asociacion de Industriales Mineros (Association of Mining Industrialists, a legal entity of the three tin magnates), was made Secretary-General.

Many of the members of the junta held multiple cabinet positions, including Guillén himself who in addition to being president was Minister of Defense and Minister of Agriculture. On 17 August, Tomás Monje assumed command of the junta. All of the members of Guillén's cabinet remained in office until Monje appointed his own ministers on 26 August. Alcoba, Solares, and Bilbao la Vieja would remain in their positions until the end of Monje's mandate.

Gallery

Notes

References

Bibliography 

 

Cabinets of Bolivia
Cabinets established in 1946
Cabinets disestablished in 1946
1946 establishments in Bolivia